Ignaux is a commune in the Ariège department in southwestern France.

Location
Ignaux is 33 km from Foix, the department capital. It is 36 km from Andorra and the French border with Spain.

The closest airport to Ignaux is Carcassonne Airport (66 km).

Population

See also
Communes of the Ariège department

References

Communes of Ariège (department)
Ariège communes articles needing translation from French Wikipedia